is a Japanese actor and voice actor from Yakumo, Hokkaido. In 1995, he enrolled in the Seinenza Theater Company. Masahiro's notable roles include Barret Wallace, and Ryid Uruk from the Final Fantasy video game series.

Filmography

Drama
Seija no Kōshin (1998), Tatsuo Inose
GTO (1998), Hajime Hakamada
Kansatsui: Akiko Murō (1998), Detective Kita
Kamen Rider Kabuto (2006), Negishi
Gonzō: Densetsu no Keiji (2008), Detective Morioka
Shōni Kyūmei (2008, episode 2), Asaoka
Samurai High School (2009), Tetsuhiko Hirano
Promise of Iyashi-ya Chirico (2015), Tokigawa Atsuya Officer
Mikaiketsu Jiken: File. 05 (2016), Kunihiro Matsuo

Film
Godzilla, Mothra and King Ghidorah: Giant Monsters All-Out Attack (2001), Teruaki Takeda
Final Fantasy VII Advent Children (2005), Barret Wallace
Koi Suru Kanojo, Nishi e (2008), Yamashita

Television animation
Detective Conan (1996), Katsumi Yamada
Hajime no Ippo (2000), Jason Ozuma

Video games
Jak and Daxter: The Precursor Legacy (2001), Warrior
Dirge of Cerberus: Final Fantasy VII (2006), Barret Wallace
Final Fantasy Type-0 (2011), Ryid Uruk
Final Fantasy Type-0 HD (2015), Ryid Uruk
Final Fantasy VII Remake (2020), Barret Wallace

Dubbing roles
South Park (2001-2006), Jerome "Chef" McElroy (season five to season ten)

References

External links
 Masahiro Kobayashi at GamePlaza-Haruka Voice Acting Database 
 Masahiro Kobayashi at Hitoshi Doi's Seiyuu Database 
 

1971 births
Living people
Japanese male film actors
Japanese male television actors
Japanese male video game actors
Japanese male voice actors
Nihon University alumni
Place of birth missing (living people)
20th-century Japanese male actors
21st-century Japanese male actors
Yakumo, Hokkaido